Lisa Holm Sørensen (born 29 September 1982) is a retired Danish professional golfer who played on the Ladies European Tour (LET) and won the Ladies Finnish Masters.

Career
Sørensen won her first LET event at the 2005 Ladies Finnish Masters, held at Helsinki Golf Club. Following the event Sørensen rose to 16th on the 2008 Money List and briefly became the leading Dane on the Ladies European Tour.

Round of 62 (−11)
In the first round of the 2009 SAS Ladies Masters at Larvik Golfklubb in Norway, Sørensen equalled the LET 18-hole record when she shot 62 (−11) on a par-73 course. At the time, she shared this feat with only three other players, Trish Johnson (1996 Ladies French Open), Kirsty Taylor (2005 Wales Ladies Championship of Europe) and Nina Reis (2008 Göteborg Masters).

Hole by hole
Source:

Hole 3, 151 yard par 3: birdie – eight-iron to three metres
Hole 6, 157 yard par 3: birdie – eight-iron to two metres
Hole 7, 425 yard par 4: birdie – nine iron to 40 cm
Hole 8, 174 yard par 3: birdie – six-iron to 1.5 metres
Hole 9, 451 yards par 5: birdie – seven-iron to 15 metres, two putts
Hole 12, 506 yard par 5: birdie – 52 degree wedge to 4 metres
Hole 13, 180 yard par 3: birdie – 5-iron to 1 metre
Hole 14, 362 yard par 4: birdie – 56 degree wedge to half a metre
Hole 15, 162 yard par 3: birdie – eight-iron to five metres
Hole 17, 434 yard par 5: birdie – second shot to four metres, two putts
Hole 18, 476 yard par 5: birdie – chip to one metre

Scorecard

Amateur wins
2000 Doug Sanders International
2001 Danish Matchplay Championship
2002 Danish Matchplay Championship, No. 9 World Championship

Professional wins

Ladies European Tour wins (1)

^Shortened to 36 holes due to severe weather conditions

Team appearances
Amateur
European Ladies' Team Championship (representing Denmark): 2001, 2003
Espirito Santo Trophy (representing Denmark): 2002

See also
Ladies European Tour records
Jim Furyk's round of 58
Lowest rounds of golf

References

External links

Danish female golfers
Ladies European Tour golfers
Sportspeople from Aalborg
People from Thisted Municipality
1982 births
Living people